The 2008 Latvian Figure Skating Championships was held in Riga from December 26 to 28, 2007. Skaters competed in the disciplines of ladies' singles and Ice dance.

Senior results

Ladies

Ice dance

External links
 results
 

2007 in figure skating
Latvian Figure Skating Championships, 2008